The 2011 National Hurling League (known as the Allianz Hurling League for sponsorship reasons) was the 80th season of the National Hurling League.

Ticket prices 
In January 2011, the GAA announced a reduction in ticket prices for the 2011 National Hurling League.
The decision to cut prices was announced at a Central Council meeting and will see the cost of admission to a league game in the first division of the NHL dropping from €15 to €13, with a €5 admission to lower-level hurling games.

Division 1

Galway came into the season as defending champions of the 2010 season. Wexford entered Division 1 as the promoted team.

On 1 May 2011, Dublin won the title following a 0–22 to 1–7 win over Kilkenny in the final. It was their first league title since 1938–39 and their 3rd National League title overall.

Offaly were relegated from Division 1. Limerick won Division 2 and secured promotion to the top tier.

Waterford's Richie Foley was the Division 1 top scorer with 2-48.

Table

Group stage

Knock-out stage

Final

Scoring statistics

Top scorers overall

Top scorers in a single game

Division 2

Limerick and Kerry entered Division 2 as the respective relegated and promoted teams from the 2010 season.

On 30 April 2011, Limerick won the title following a 4–12 to 2–13 win over Clare in the final.

Westmeath were relegated from Division 2 after losing all of their group stage matches.

Antrim's Neil McManus was the Division 2 top scorer with 4-46.

Table

Round Robin

Group stage

Knock-out stage

Final

Scoring statistics

Top scorers overall

Top scorers in a single game

Division 3A

Kildare and Wicklow entered Division 3A as the respective relegated and promoted teams from the 2010 season.

On 17 April 2011, Wicklow won the title following a 2–20 to 3–14 win over Derry in the final.

Armagh were relegated from Division 3A after losing all but one of their group stage matches.

Wicklow's Jonathan O'Neill was the Division 3A top scorer with 2-52.

Table

Group stage

Knock-out stage

Final

Scoring statistics

Top scorers overall

Top scorers in a single game

Division 3B

Mayo and Monaghan entered Division 3B as the respective relegated and promoted teams from the 2010 season.

On 17 April 2011, Roscommon won the title following a 0–17 to 1–12 win over Mayo in the final.

Monaghan were relegated from Division 3B after losing all but one of their group stage matches.

Table

Group stage

Knock-out stage

Final

Scoring statistics

Top scorers overall

Top scorers in a single game

Division 4

Tyrone entered Division 4 as the relegated team from the 2010 season.

On 17 April 2011, Tyrone won the title following a 1–15 to 0–11 win over South Down in the final.

Longford's Eoin Donnellan was the Division 4 top scorer with 0-40.

Table

Group stage

Knock-out stage

Final

Scoring statistics

Top scorers overall

Top scorers in a single game

References

 
National Hurling League seasons